Huertapelayo is a hamlet located in the municipality of Zaorejas, in Guadalajara province, Castilla–La Mancha, Spain. As of 2020, it has a population of 11.

Geography 
Huertapelayo is located 130km east-northeast of Guadalajara, Spain.

References

Populated places in the Province of Guadalajara